was the seventh of ten s, and the first to be built for the Imperial Japanese Navy under the Circle Two Program (Maru Ni Keikaku).

History
Despite being one of the most powerful classes of destroyers in the world at the time of their completion, none survived the Pacific War.

Umikaze, built at the Maizuru Naval Arsenal was laid down on 4 May 1935, launched on 27 November 1936 and commissioned on 31 May 1937.

Operational history
From January 1942, Umikaze participated in operations in the Netherlands East Indies, including the invasion of Tarakan Island, and landings at Balikpapan and Makassar. After participating in the invasion of eastern Java, Umikaze was engaged in convoy duty, and thus escaped combat during the Battle of the Java Sea.

In April, Umikaze assisted in the invasion of Panay and Negros in the Philippines. From 10 April, Umikaze was reassigned to the IJN 1st Fleet and returned to Sasebo Naval Arsenal for repairs at the end of May.

During the Battle of Midway on 4–6 June, Umikaze was part of the Aleutians Guard Force under Admiral Shirō Takasu. She was assigned back to the IJN 2nd Fleet on 14 July after the Midway Operation was cancelled.

Umikaze escorted the aircraft carrier  from Yokosuka to Truk in mid-August, and continued on the Guadalcanal, where she was assigned to eleven “Tokyo Express” missions through the end of September. During a mission on 24 September, she suffered damage from a near miss by American aircraft, killing eight crewmen, and necessitating a return to Truk for repairs. In October, Umikaze participated in two missions to bombard Henderson Field on Guadalcanal, and on 26 October was part of Admiral Nobutake Kondō’s force at the Battle of the Santa Cruz Islands. On a troop transport run to Buna, Umikaze suffered heavy damage in an air strike by USAAF B-17 Flying Fortress bombers, and had to be towed back to Rabaul by the destroyer   for emergency repairs. Umikaze was withdrawn to Truk by the end of December, and returned to Sasebo for repairs by 5 January 1943.

Umikaze returned to active duty at the end of February 1943, escorting a troop convoy to Truk, and then conducting patrols out of Truk to the end of April. In June, Umikaze led a troop transport mission to Ponape and Nauru and continued on with escort duties between Truk and the Japanese home islands through the end of November.

Umikaze went into dock at Sasebo in November, where her “X” turret was removed and replaced by additional Type 96 anti-aircraft guns. She returned to active duty at the end of December, escorting a troop convoy to Truk, and then patrolling out of Saipan from mid-January 1944. She sank slowly, allowing for 215 survivors, with 50 crewmen lost.

She was removed from the navy list on 31 March 1944.

Notes

References

External links

Shiratsuyu-class destroyers
World War II destroyers of Japan
Ships sunk by American submarines
World War II shipwrecks in the Pacific Ocean
Ships built by Maizuru Naval Arsenal
1936 ships
Maritime incidents in February 1944